The Hacket River is a river on the West Coast of New Zealand. It starts in the Malcolm Range and flows south-west into the Tasman Sea.

See also
List of rivers of New Zealand

References

Land Information New Zealand - Search for Place Names

Westland District
Rivers of the West Coast, New Zealand
Rivers of New Zealand